Dionne Lake (variant: DionneLake) is a lake in Kivalliq Region, Nunavut, Canada. The area is frequented by caribou.

Notable residents
Dionne Lake was home at one time to Inuit sculptor John Pangnark.

References

Lakes of Kivalliq Region